The following are the telephone codes in Sudan.

Calling formats
To call in Sudan, the following format is used:
 0tp axx xxxx - calls within Sudan
 +249 tp axx xxxx - calls from outside Sudan
 where
 t is the Service Type Identifier (1 for fixed lines, 9 for mobile),
 p is the Service Provider Identifier, and
 a is the Area Code.
 For fixed lines: a is 3: Khartoum; 5: Khartoum North; 6: Khartoum Rural; 7: Omdurman

Company codes

 * 18 is mentioned within the contact number, but not in the table. It is possible that code 18 became 12 at some point, though there is speculation that 12 is simply a new number range.

References

Sudan
Telecommunications in Sudan
Telephone numbers